The World RX of Benelux is a Rallycross event held in Belgium for the FIA World Rallycross Championship. The event made its debut in the 2019 season, at the Circuit de Spa-Francorchamps and replaced World RX of Belgium event at the Circuit Jules Tacheny Mettet in the town of Mettet, Wallonia.

Past winners

References

External links

Belgium
Auto races in Belgium